Ole Sørensen (25 November 1937 – 29 January 2015) was a former Danish football player. He played 25 matches and scored 7 goals for the Danish national football team between 1961 and 1969, and represented his country at the 1964 European Championship. On the club level, he played for the Copenhagen club KB in Denmark, FC Köln in Germany and PSV Eindhoven in the Netherlands.

External links
Danish national team player

1937 births
2015 deaths
Expatriate footballers in Germany
Danish men's footballers
Danish expatriate men's footballers
1964 European Nations' Cup players
Denmark international footballers
Kjøbenhavns Boldklub players
1. FC Köln players
PSV Eindhoven players
Association football midfielders
German footballers needing infoboxes